Andrea Beaumont, also known as the Phantasm, is a fictional DC Entertainment supervillain and antiheroine created by Alan Burnett and Paul Dini, and designed by Bruce Timm. Beaumont first appeared as the main antagonist in the 1993 DC Animated Universe (DCAU) film Batman: Mask of the Phantasm, where she was established as the girlfriend-then-ex-fiancée of Bruce Wayne/Batman prior to and around the time he first began his vigilante career. Dana Delany provided the voice work for Andrea and Stacy Keach provided the electronically modified voice of her "Phantasm" alter ego.

Andrea Beaumont has made occasional appearances in various DCAU Batman media in her Phantasm guise, often as a freelance assassin working with Amanda Waller. In December 2020, Beaumont made her main DC Universe comic book debut in Tom King's Batman/Catwoman 12-issue maxiseries.

Mask of the Phantasm

Character design

In keeping with Batman: The Animated Series''' film noir inspiration and "Dark Deco" visual style, Bruce Timm created Andrea's civilian design to reference women's fashion from the 1940s, including: red hair in a long bob (reminiscent of Lauren Bacall), "sweater girl" sweaters, high-waisted pencil skirts, wrap dresses, and pumps.

Timm designed the Phantasm's costume to reflect Alan Burnett's initial description of a Grim Reaper-esque character. Burnett wanted the villain to be reminiscent of the Ghost of Christmas Future, a similarity that the Joker mentions in the film.Batman: Mask of the Phantasm. Dir. Eric Radomski and Bruce W. Timm. Perf. Kevin Conroy, Dana Delany, Mark Hamill, and Hart Bochner. 1993. DVD. Warner Home Video. October 4, 2005. Timm went through approximately 20 different character designs for the Phantasm before creating a version that would evolve into the final design. Five alternate designs for the Phantasm's costume were featured in HBO's "First Look" television preview for Mask of the Phantasm.

Described by Timm as resembling a "tall, gaunt Death character", the Phantasm's costume is hooded and features a metal, skull-like mask. The Phantasm carries a large blade, reminiscent of a scythe, in her right hand. The blade was not part of Timm's original design, and was added later at Burnett's insistence. The character's left glove houses a chemically-based, artificial fog-generating device that the Phantasm uses for stealth, combat, and intimidation. At various points in Mask of the Phantasm, the Phantasm's manipulation of fog makes it appear that the character has supernatural powers, such as intangibility and the ability to vanish. These smoke-filled appearances were influenced by the Marvel Comics supervillain Mysterio.

The Phantasm's facade is completed by a masculine voice provided by Stacy Keach, which was digitally altered in post-production to be deeper and echo. Portions of Keach's unmodified performance can be heard in Mask of the Phantasm's theatrical trailer, including the Phantasm's signature phrase: "Your angel of death awaits". The Phantasm's on-screen presence is accompanied by an eerie theme composed by Shirley Walker that prominently features the theremin.

Role
The screenwriters of Batman: Mask of the Phantasm included Alan Burnett, Martin Pasko, Paul Dini, and Michael Reaves. Pasko wrote many of the flashback sequences (including those featuring Andrea and Reaves) and the final showdown between Batman, the Phantasm, and the Joker. Andrea is based loosely on a combination of Judson Caspian (the Reaper) and his daughter Rachel, characters from the four-issue 1987 "Batman: Year Two" comic book storyline that ran in Detective Comics #575-578. According to Kevin Conroy, Andrea was named after voice director Andrea Romano.

In Mask of the Phantasm, producer Alan Burnett "wanted to do a big love story with Bruce because we hadn't really done it on the TV show. I wanted a story that got into his head". Burnett centered Andrea in his conception of the film's story: "We wanted to make a big movie story. We were telling a story about 'the girl who got away'. The one woman who could have stopped Bruce from ever becoming Batman". The resulting narrative, which dealt with Bruce's decision to become and remain Batman, hinged on Bruce and Andrea's relationship.

Andrea's role in Mask of the Phantasm corresponds with that of the femme fatale from hardboiled detective fiction and Hawksian woman from film noir. Burnett felt that the film's narrative should be removed from Batman's traditional rogues gallery. The fact that Andrea is revealed as the main villain in a plot twist is a convention of the femme fatale stock character.

Andrea serves as a foil for Batman. The characters are very similar; they both don an intimidating costume and speak to the gravestones of their parents (as if holding a conversation with the deceased). The paralleling of their characters — most importantly the death of their parents at the hand of criminals — highlights how different they are: Though they both became vigilantes, Andrea chose to become a killer, following a warped code of "eye for an eye" justice, while Bruce chose a code of ethics that forbids killing.

Plot

Andrea Beaumont is the daughter of financier Carl Beaumont and his late wife Victoria. Since his wife's death, Carl has devoted himself to Andrea's future. In her youth, while attending Gotham University, she meets fellow student and billionaire Bruce Wayne, and they fall in love. Bruce vacillates between the promise he made to his murdered parents to fight crime versus starting a married life with Andrea, which he feels his parents would have wanted for him had they lived to see him grown. Bruce dons a mask and leather jacket and stops a truck hijacking, but is not pleased as the robbers mocked him instead of being intimidated on sight. The lukewarm success and growing love for Andrea brings Bruce to the conclusion to abandon crime-fighting - instead pledging part of his inheritance to the Gotham City Police Department - so he can marry Andrea. Right before Bruce makes his decision, he was exploring a grotto on his property and is met by Andrea. After the two briefly explore what would soon be the Batcave, Bruce proposes marriage, and Andrea gladly says yes.

Andrea discovers that her father is in business with the Mafia, and set up dummy corporations for some of the most powerful mob bosses in Gotham: Chuckie Sol, Sal Valestra, and Buzz Bronski. When the mobsters learn that Carl has made unauthorized investments, they consider it defalcation and want immediate repayment. Unable to quickly access the money he has stolen and invested, Carl and Andrea hastily flee to Europe, forcing Andrea to reluctantly break off her engagement with Bruce, thus leading to him diving down the path to become a vigilante after losing a chance at a normal life. Andrea later recounts how she and her father bounced around various parts of Europe before finally presumably settling somewhere in the coastal regions of the Mediterranean Sea.

A few years later, Arthur Reeves, who was once a lawyer in Beaumont's employ and the only one entrusted with knowledge of the Beaumont's flight, is seeking election to the Gotham city council but has run out of money. Carl Beaumont refuses to contribute to Reeves' campaign, and in retaliation Reeves sells information on the Beaumonts' whereabouts to the mob, though Reeves is unaware about their sinister intentions. Although Carl has returned the money, the mobsters demanded "interest" in the form of his life due to his unpunctuality. They send one of their goons, who would later become Bruce's archenemy the Joker, to do the job. When returning from food shopping, Andrea passes by the hitman, who gives her a nonchalant look and moves on, in fear and distress she tries to tell him her father paid them back only for him to ignore it. Andrea goes inside, then screams at seeing her murdered father.

Consumed with rage and hatred, Andrea waits patiently and trains herself for many years, planning to take revenge on the men who had her father killed and ruined her life and happiness. When she returns to Gotham, she dons a terrifying costume reminiscent of the Grim Reaper, complete with a smoke-generating device and scythe-bladed gauntlet. Disguised as such, she kills Sol and Bronski after taunting them by saying "Your angel of death awaits". Shortly before his death, Sol was attacked by Batman who attempted to thwart his plans to flood Gotham with high-quality fake money. Sol's death was seen by multiple witnesses, who then observe Batman. This leads to Batman being blamed for the killings of Bronski and Sol and branded a fugitive. Arthur Reeves, now an experienced selectman, rallies his constituency into demanding peace and ordering the Gotham Police to hunt Batman (over the objections of Commissioner Gordon, who stays out of it). Soon after killing Bronski in the graveyard, Andrea visits her mother's grave, where she first met Bruce. Batman, also drawn to his parents' grave after investigating the crime scene, is shocked to see her. He quickly flees, but Andrea notices and immediately guesses his secret identity. Batman later discovers the link between the mobsters and Carl Beaumont and questions Andrea on the topic, but she rebuffs him. Valestra, now in failing health, appeals to Reeves for protection from Batman, pointing how in addition to paying him off for selling out Carl Beaumont he also provided Reeves with inside information such as blackmail on his political enemies, but Reeves rebuffs Valestra as a has-been. Valestra then seeks out the Joker to kill Batman, aware of their long feud. Joker declines at first, saying he is not "pest control", but changes his mind when Valestra offers money and remembering old times. 

Andrea breaks into Valestra's home to murder him, only to find Joker has beaten her to the punch and set a trap intended for Batman. She escapes unharmed, but Batman attempts to apprehend her. After a brief rooftop skirmish, the Phantasm absconds in a cloud of smoke as the police arrive on the scene. When Andrea realizes that the police will arrest Batman in her stead, she quickly changes out of her costume and helps him escape. At Wayne Manor, in a final attempt to conceal her vendetta, Andrea lies to Bruce that the Phantasm is her father and that she has returned to Gotham to stop his killing spree. Unaware that Carl was murdered, Bruce believes her. Meanwhile, Joker goes to Reeves to inform him that Batman is not responsible for the wave of killings. When Reeves refuses to believe about the Phantasm, Joker attacks him with Joker venom, but the process is interrupted as Andrea soon comes for him. Proof of Reeves' conspiring with the Valestra mob is exposed, however the incomplete poisoning has left him in a state of constant hysteria, likely leaving him incompetent to face charges.

Andrea tracks the Joker to his hideout at the derelict Gotham World Fairgrounds, but he has guessed her identity and anticipated the attack. The two battle in the "Home of the Future" exhibit (also seen in a flashback where Bruce took Andrea on a date, and took a special interest in a model car on display), before the Joker lures Andrea to a giant turbine. He attempts to kill her by sucking her into it, but Batman intervenes, breaking the machine before its blades would have crushed Andrea. She attempts to justify her actions: "They took everything, Bruce. My dad, my life, you. I'm not saying it's right, or even sane, but it's all I've got left. [...] They had to pay!" Batman attempts to reason with Andrea and begs her to leave, and she disappears in a cloud of smoke. After a stalemate battle between Batman and the Joker that sees both men on the brink of exhaustion, the fairgrounds - rigged with explosives - detonate and begin to crumble. Andrea reappears and explains that "one way or another, it ends tonight". With the defeated Joker in her power, Andrea bids farewell and disappears with her captive before Batman can stop her.

After barely escaping the fairgrounds' destruction through a series of sewers, Batman assumes that Andrea and the Joker have perished. However, Andrea survives and leaves a locket for Bruce in the Batcave as a keepsake. In the penultimate scene of the film, a saddened Andrea stands alone at night on the deck of an ocean liner.

DCAU animation and comics 
Her first real appearance was in the movie adaptation mini comic that came with the VHS release (this comic was a digest size) and was released in December 1993.  Simultaneously there was a Prestige Format which was the traditional sized comic. Both of these books had the same red cover. There was a Newstand edition which featured a different cover. 

Adventures
The Phantasm makes her first returning appearance in "Shadow of the Phantasm", a story in the comic Batman & Robin Adventures Annual #1 (November 1996). In a direct sequel to Mask of the Phantasm, Andrea and Batman defeat Arthur Reeves, who - having been driven mad with a permanent grin on his face by the Joker as the doctors were unable to fully treat him - is determined to exact revenge on Beaumont and Batman, who he finally learns is Bruce Wayne, with Reeves falling to his death.

In 2004's Batman Adventures: Shadows and Masks, Andrea goes undercover in Black Mask's organization, the False Face Society. During this story arc, she meets Bruce (who was also infiltrating the organisation as his criminal disguise "Matches Malone") at Wayne Manor and asks him not to interfere with her operation. He coldly rebukes her, calling her a "killer". She eventually fights Batgirl and has her captured and put in a water tank to kill her only for her to be freed by Bruce who was present there and then later tries to kill Black Mask.

"Epilogue"
The Phantasm makes a cameo appearance as an assassin in the season 2 finale episode of the television series Justice League Unlimited: "Epilogue" (2005). Years after Bruce retired from crimefighting at the beginning of Batman Beyond, Andrea, now an elderly woman but still active as a mercenary, is hired by Amanda Waller who was concerned about Batman's eventual death or retirement, to murder Terry McGinnis' parents', whose son is secretly also Bruce's under genetic tampering. The psychological trauma, Waller reasons, may steer Terry toward becoming Wayne's successor as Batman. However, the Phantasm abandons the hit moments before she would have slain the young couple. Andrea argues that the murder would defile the Batman legacy by breaking Bruce's paramount rule: to never take a life. Andrea's change of heart marks the official end of Waller's "Project Batman Beyond", though chance would compel Terry to eventually become Bruce's successor regardless after his father is murdered. In the episode, Andrea has no lines or voice actor. Her sentiments are conveyed through Waller's monologue recounting the event.

Batman Beyond 2.0
The Phantasm returns in "Mark of the Phantasm", a seven-part storyline in the 2015 digital comic Batman Beyond 2.0 (set after the Batman Beyond animated series). At the secret behest of Amanda Waller, Andrea seeks out the great-grandnephew of Joe Chill, Jake Chill (a.k.a. the Vigilante), for the murder of Terry McGinnis' father. Beaumont is charged with killing Jake before Terry learns of Jake's guilt, in an effort to remove any temptation for Terry to attempt the same.

After an initial attempt on Jake's life fails due to Terry's intercession, Andrea visits Bruce in the Batcave. Bruce reveals that he searched for Andrea, and attempts to convince her that it is not too late for them. Andrea acknowledges that, despite their similarities, they are at loggerheads: "I do things Batman can't. I always have". Beaumont abandons her second attempt on Jake's life when he accidentally dies from exposure to Joker venom.

DC Universe

Andrea Beaumont/Phantasm made her comic debut in Batman/Catwoman limited series by writer Tom King and artist Clay Mann in December 2020. Previously revealed in 2019, posted on Twitter by King and Mann, the image of the Phantasm included Batman and Catwoman reflected in the Phantasm's scythe, in addition to the text "She awaits you" (a reference to the Phantasm's catchphrase) and the series title.

DC Comics describes Beaumont's role in one of three timelines featured in the comic: "And in the present, Bruce and Selina's union is threatened by the arrival of one of Batman's past flings, Andrea Beaumont, a.k.a. Phantasm. Beaumont's return calls into question how each character chooses to operate in their costumed, and personal, lives, and any move by Phantasm could change the fate of Bruce and Selina's future".

Minor appearances
 Andrea Beaumont is mentioned as an easter egg in Batman: Arkham Origins, where postcards from Rome and Paris addressed to Bruce Wayne bear her signature. In those postcards, she is confirmed to be looking for her father and telling Bruce he knows how to meet her.
 The Phantasm appears as a playable character in the Lego DC Super-Villains video game as downloadable content. She was one of the playable characters for the Batman: The Animated Series story level and would become a permanent playable character upon completion.
 In Batman: Li'l Gotham, the Phantasm's mask was placed on display in the Batcave.
 Her mask was mentioned in Batwoman episode "Meet Your Maker".
 An easter egg in The Lego Batman Movie is an advertisement for a fragrance called "Musk of the Phantasm".

Action figures

In conjunction with the release of Mask of the Phantasm'' in 1993, Kenner released a Phantasm action figure. The toy was packaged with Phantasm's mask and cloak off, revealing the villain's secret identity, and — apocryphally — spoiling the plot twist for audiences. This model was later re-released as part of a "Rogues Gallery" box set, but with the costume's grey and black coloring transposed.

In 2016, DC Collectibles released a new action figure in their six inch highly-articulated toy line based on Batman the Animated Series, packed with a re-release of the Batman figure from the series. This figure is more precisely sculpted and has more articulation, though does not include an unmasked Beaumont portrait or feature seen in the 4 inch figure.

References

Action figures
DC Animated Universe original characters
DC Comics female supervillains
DC Comics martial artists
Batman: The Animated Series characters
Fictional assassins in comics
Fictional female assassins
Fictional female murderers
Fictional women soldiers and warriors
Comics characters introduced in 1993
Characters created by Bruce Timm
Female characters in film
Animated human characters
Female film villains
Film supervillains
Vigilante characters in comics